4hero are an electronic music group from Dollis Hill, London, comprising producers Mark "Marc Mac" Clair & Denis "Dego" McFarlane. While the band is often cited as 4 Hero or 4-Hero, the name is stylised as 4hero on their albums and website. 4hero are known for being pioneers of breakbeat hardcore, jungle/drum and bass, broken beat and nu jazz music.

Style
4hero's style was initially uptempo breakbeat, house and techno, and has progressed to breakbeat hardcore, oldschool jungle, and drum and bass. Comparisons have been drawn between them and East London band Shut Up and Dance, with both bands evolving in the early 1990s as a rapprochement between the breakbeat-driven African-diasporic musical structures of hip-hop and reggae, and the dark, European reconstruction of the techno sound popularised by the likes of Joey Beltram, CJ Bolland and Mundo Muzique. 4hero both embraced the dynamics of populist rave culture, and maintained an avant-garde status as innovative and experimental producers. They trailblazed genre-crossing studio techniques such as timestretching and pitch-shifting.

Early history, 1989–1995
The main players in 4hero first met and came to prominence in the late 1980s when they were involved in the Strong Island FM pirate radio station. Marc Mac and Gus Lawrence set up Reinforced Records in 1989 to release their own productions as 4hero, with the group being completed by Dego and Ian Bardouille. Their first release was the 1990 single "All B 3 / Rising Son".

The follow-up EP, Combat Dancin''', underpinned the sub-bass pressure of the bleep 'n' bass artists associated with Sheffield's Warp Records, such as LFO and Nightmares on Wax, with mid-tempo hip-hop-style breakbeats. It also brought the group to the attention of the rave community due to the track "Mr Kirk's Nightmare", which pivoted around the "Get Into Something" break (taken from the Isley Brothers) and a morbid vocal sample ("Mr Kirk? Your son is dead. He died of an overdose.") taken from the Bobby Susser, anti-drug hit "Once You Understand" by Think. 4hero were among the first proponents of what would become known as "drum and bass", which began to grow in profile via a series of releases on Reinforced. Another drum and bass figurehead, Goldie, met 4hero at a performance in London's Astoria. Marc and Dego went on to teach and collaborate with Goldie which then brought the sounds Goldie envisioned to life, forming the Rufige Cru and Metalheadz monikers.

The band's debut album, In Rough Territory, was released in 1991 on Reinforced. This would be the only one of the group's albums to feature Gus and Ian as full members. In late 1992 and early 1993, 4hero would release the darkcore Journey from the Light EP, which according to and referenced by music journalist Simon Reynolds, "If anyone can claim to have invented dark-core, it's 4 Hero".

Marc Mac and Dego would also record together under the alias "Tom & Jerry" (releasing classics such as "The One Reason", "We Can Be Free", "Maximum Style", and "Air Freshener"), whilst Marc Mac solely as "Manix" (Manic Minds EP, Rainbow People EP, and "Heading to the Light") and Dego as "Tek 9" ("Just a Dream", and Return of Tek 9 EP).

In 1995, NME voted 4hero's second album Parallel Universe the album of the year in its dance category.

1996-present 
In 1997, one of their tracks, a remix of Nuyorican Soul's "Black Gold of the Sun", was released to critical acclaim with Louie Vega describing it as "...one of the best remixes ever...".  

The next year, 4hero rose again to mainstream visibility with their third studio album as 4hero, Two Pages (1998). Released on Gilles Peterson's Talkin' Loud record label, the double CD blended jazzy double bass, flowing breakbeats and a brew of mysticism, spiritualism, astrology, U.F.O.s, and environmentalism. Luke Parkhouse provided the drums while Ursula Rucker, Carol Crosby and Face V. Walsh provided vocals alongside veteran singer Terry Callier and a few other special guests. The album gained critical acclaim and a place on the shortlist for 1998's Mercury Music Prize as well as picking up a MOBO award in the same year. Both this album and artists recording on 4hero's Reinforced label were influential in the development of the broken beat scene.

Between 1998 and 2001, they hosted a Sunday night show with Kirk Degiorgio on Kiss 100 FM under the "R Solution" moniker.

4hero's fourth album, Creating Patterns (2001), featured another Ursula Rucker collaboration, an appearance from Jill Scott, and a cover of Minnie Riperton's classic 1970s song "Les Fleurs" with Carina Andersson as the lead vocalist. The latter was featured in a Baileys TV commercial and series 4 of Top Gear (both in 2004).

In 2004, the group released a compilation album consisting of two discs. The first disc contained 4hero remixes, while the tracks on disc 2 are remixes of 4hero tracks by other artists. This was released on their new label Raw Canvas. In 2006, 4hero was featured on the track "Bed of Roses" by Jody Watley on her album, The Makeover.

Six years after the release of Creating Patterns, Play with the Changes was released in February 2007 to critical acclaim. Mixmag described it as "their finest album to date" and awarded it the title of Album of the Month in its January 2007 issue.

In 2012, the album Hipology was released under the alias The Visioneers.

Discography
Albums
 In Rough Territory (Reinforced Records, 1991)
 Parallel Universe (Reinforced Records, 1994)
 Two Pages (Talkin' Loud, 1998)
 Two Pages Remixed (Talkin' Loud, 1998)
 Two Pages Reinterpretations (Talkin' Loud, 1999)
 Creating Patterns (Talkin' Loud, 2001)
 The Remix Album (Raw Canvas Records, 2004)
 4 Hero Present Brazilika (Far Out Recordings, 2006)
 Play with the Changes (Raw Canvas Records, 2007)
 Extensions (Raw Canvas Records, 2009)
 Hipology (as the Visioneers)" (BBE Records, 2012)

Selected singles/EPs
 "All B 3 / Rising Son" (Reinforced Records, 1990)
 "Combat Dancin' / Mr Kirks Nightmare" (Reinforced Records, 1990)
 "The Scorcher / Kirk's Back" (Reinforced Records, 1990)
 "No Sleep Raver/Marimba" (Reinforced Records, 1991)	
 "The Head Hunter" (Reinforced Records, 1991)	
 "Cookin Up Ya Brain / Where's the Boy?" (Reinforced Records, 1992)
 "Journey from the Light" (Reinforced Records, 1993)	
 "Golden Age" (Reinforced Records, 1993)	
 Internal Affairs EP (with Goldie as Internal Affairs) (Reinforced Records, 1993)
 "Mr. Kirk" (Sm:)e Communications, 1995)
 Universal Love EP'' (Selector, 1995)	
 "Earth Pioneers" (Talkin' Loud, 1997) 	
 "Loveless" (Talkin' Loud, 1997) 	
 "Star Chasers" (Talkin' Loud, 1998)
 "We Who Are Not as Others" (Talkin' Loud, 1998)	
 "Escape That" (Talkin' Loud, 1999)	
 "Les Fleur" (Talkin' Loud, 2001)	
 "Morning Child" (Raw Canvas Records, 2007) 	
 "Look Inside" (featuring Face) (Raw Canvas Records, 2008)

See also
 Reinforced Records

References

External links
Official site
Archived Site at Wayback Machine

Tom and Jerry discography at Discogs

English electronic music duos
British drum and bass music groups
Drum and bass duos
Breakbeat hardcore music groups
English dance music groups
Musical groups from the London Borough of Brent
Reinforced Records artists
Sonar Kollektiv artists
Talkin' Loud artists
Black British musical groups
Musical groups established in 1989
Electronic dance music duos